Elka Georgieva Konstantinova (25 May 1932 – 12 January 2023) was a Bulgarian literary critic and politician. A member of the Radical Democratic Party, she served as Minister of Culture from 1991 to 1992.

Konstantinova died on 12 January 2023, at the age of 90.

References

1932 births
2023 deaths
Bulgarian literary critics
Radical Democratic Party (Bulgaria) politicians
Union of Democratic Forces (Bulgaria) politicians
Ministers of Culture of Bulgaria
Sofia University alumni
Members of the National Assembly (Bulgaria)
Politicians from Sofia